Ctenophora (ctenophore) comprise a phylum of marine invertebrates, commonly known as comb jellies, that inhabit sea waters worldwide. They are notable for the groups of cilia they use for swimming (commonly referred to as "combs"), and they are the largest animals to swim with the help of cilia.

Only 100 to 150 species have been validated, and possibly another 25 have not been fully described and named. The textbook examples are cydippids with egg-shaped bodies and a pair of retractable tentacles fringed with tentilla ("little tentacles") that are covered with colloblasts, sticky cells that capture prey.

Their bodies consist of a mass of jelly, with a layer two cells thick on the outside, and another lining the internal cavity. The phylum has a wide range of body forms, including the egg-shaped cydippids with retractable tentacles that capture prey, the flat generally combless platyctenids, and the large-mouthed beroids, which prey on other ctenophores.

Almost all ctenophores function as predators, taking prey ranging from microscopic larvae and rotifers to the adults of small crustaceans; the exceptions are juveniles of two species, which live as parasites on the salps on which adults of their species feed.

Despite their soft, gelatinous bodies, fossils thought to represent ctenophores appear in lagerstätten dating as far back as the early Cambrian, about 525 million years ago. The position of the ctenophores in the "tree of life" has long been debated in molecular phylogenetics studies. Biologists proposed that ctenophores constitute the second-earliest branching animal lineage, with sponges being the sister-group to all other multicellular animals (Porifera Sister Hypothesis). Other biologists contend that ctenophores were emerging earlier than sponges (Ctenophora Sister Hypothesis), which themselves appeared before the split between cnidarians and bilaterians. Pisani et al. reanalyzed of the data and suggest that the computer algorithms used for analysis were misled by the presence of specific ctenophore genes that were markedly different from those of other species. Follow up analysis by Whelan et al. (2017) yielded further support for the Ctenophora Sister hypothesis, and the issue remains a matter of taxonomic dispute.

Distinguishing features

Among animal phyla, the Ctenophores are more complex than sponges, about as complex as cnidarians (jellyfish, sea anemones, etc.), and less complex than bilaterians (which include almost all other animals). Unlike sponges, both ctenophores and cnidarians have: cells bound by inter-cell connections and carpet-like basement membranes; muscles; nervous systems; and some have sensory organs. Ctenophores are distinguished from all other animals by having colloblasts, which are sticky and adhere to prey, although a few ctenophore species lack them.

Like sponges and cnidarians, ctenophores have two main layers of cells that sandwich a middle layer of jelly-like material, which is called the mesoglea in cnidarians and ctenophores; more complex animals have three main cell layers and no intermediate jelly-like layer. Hence ctenophores and cnidarians have traditionally been labelled diploblastic, along with sponges. Both ctenophores and cnidarians have a type of muscle that, in more complex animals, arises from the middle cell layer, and as a result some recent text books classify ctenophores as triploblastic, while others still regard them as diploblastic. The comb jellies have more than 80 different cell types, exceeding the numbers from other groups like placozoans, sponges, cnidarians, and some deep-branching bilaterians.

Most species have eight strips, called comb rows, that run the length of their bodies and bear comb-like bands of cilia, called "ctenes", stacked along the comb rows so that when the cilia beat, those of each comb touch the comb below. The name "ctenophora" means "comb-bearing", from the Greek κτείς (stem-form κτεν-) meaning "comb" and the Greek suffix -φορος meaning "carrying".

Description

For a phylum with relatively few species, ctenophores have a wide range of body plans. Coastal species need to be tough enough to withstand waves and swirling sediment particles, while some oceanic species are so fragile that it is very difficult to capture them intact for study. In addition, oceanic species do not preserve well, and are known mainly from photographs and from observers' notes. Hence most attention has until recently concentrated on three coastal genera – Pleurobrachia, Beroe and Mnemiopsis. At least two textbooks base their descriptions of ctenophores on the cydippid Pleurobrachia.

Since the body of many species is almost radially symmetrical, the main axis is oral to aboral (from the mouth to the opposite end). However, since only two of the canals near the statocyst terminate in anal pores, ctenophores have no mirror-symmetry, although many have rotational symmetry. In other words, if the animal rotates in a half-circle it looks the same as when it started.

Common features
The Ctenophore phylum has a wide range of body forms, including the flattened, deep-sea platyctenids, in which the adults of most species lack combs, and the coastal beroids, which lack tentacles and prey on other ctenophores by using huge mouths armed with groups of large, stiffened cilia that act as teeth.

Body layers

Like those of cnidarians, (jellyfish, sea anemones, etc.), ctenophores' bodies consist of a relatively thick, jelly-like mesoglea sandwiched between two epithelia, layers of cells bound by inter-cell connections and by a fibrous basement membrane that they secrete. The epithelia of ctenophores have two layers of cells rather than one, and some of the cells in the upper layer have several cilia per cell.

The outer layer of the epidermis (outer skin) consists of: sensory cells; cells that secrete mucus, which protects the body; and interstitial cells, which can transform into other types of cell. In specialized parts of the body, the outer layer also contains colloblasts, found along the surface of tentacles and used in capturing prey, or cells bearing multiple large cilia, for locomotion. The inner layer of the epidermis contains a nerve net, and myoepithelial cells that act as muscles.

The internal cavity forms: a mouth that can usually be closed by muscles; a pharynx ("throat"); a wider area in the center that acts as a stomach; and a system of internal canals. These branch through the mesoglea to the most active parts of the animal: the mouth and pharynx; the roots of the tentacles, if present; all along the underside of each comb row; and four branches around the sensory complex at the far end from the mouth – two of these four branches terminate in anal pores. The inner surface of the cavity is lined with an epithelium, the gastrodermis. The mouth and pharynx have both cilia and well-developed muscles. In other parts of the canal system, the gastrodermis is different on the sides nearest to and furthest from the organ that it supplies. The nearer side is composed of tall nutritive cells that store nutrients in vacuoles (internal compartments), germ cells that produce eggs or sperm, and photocytes that produce bioluminescence. The side furthest from the organ is covered with ciliated cells that circulate water through the canals, punctuated by ciliary rosettes, pores that are surrounded by double whorls of cilia and connect to the mesoglea.

Feeding, excretion and respiration
When prey is swallowed, it is liquefied in the pharynx by enzymes and by muscular contractions of the pharynx. The resulting slurry is wafted through the canal system by the beating of the cilia, and digested by the nutritive cells. The ciliary rosettes in the canals may help to transport nutrients to muscles in the mesoglea. The anal pores may eject unwanted small particles, but most unwanted matter is regurgitated via the mouth.

Little is known about how ctenophores get rid of waste products produced by the cells. The ciliary rosettes in the gastrodermis may help to remove wastes from the mesoglea, and may also help to adjust the animal's buoyancy by pumping water into or out of the mesoglea.

Locomotion
The outer surface bears usually eight comb rows, called swimming-plates, which are used for swimming. The rows are oriented to run from near the mouth (the "oral pole") to the opposite end (the "aboral pole"), and are spaced more or less evenly around the body, although spacing patterns vary by species and in most species the comb rows extend only part of the distance from the aboral pole towards the mouth. Unlike conventional cilia and flagella, which has a filament structure arranged in a 9 + 2 pattern, these cilia are arranged in a 9 + 3 pattern, where the extra compact filament is suspected to have a supporting function. These normally beat so that the propulsion stroke is away from the mouth, although they can also reverse direction. Hence ctenophores usually swim in the direction in which the mouth is eating, unlike jellyfish. When trying to escape predators, one species can accelerate to six times its normal speed; some other species reverse direction as part of their escape behavior, by reversing the power stroke of the comb plate cilia.

It is uncertain how ctenophores control their buoyancy, but experiments have shown that some species rely on osmotic pressure to adapt to the water of different densities. Their body fluids are normally as concentrated as seawater. If they enter less dense brackish water, the ciliary rosettes in the body cavity may pump this into the mesoglea to increase its bulk and decrease its density, to avoid sinking. Conversely, if they move from brackish to full-strength seawater, the rosettes may pump water out of the mesoglea to reduce its volume and increase its density.

Nervous system and senses
Ctenophores have no brain or central nervous system, but instead have a nerve net (rather like a cobweb) that forms a ring round the mouth and is densest near structures such as the comb rows, pharynx, tentacles (if present) and the sensory complex furthest from the mouth. Fossils shows that Cambrian species had a more complex nervous system, with long nerves which connected with a ring around the mouth. The only known ctenophores with long nerves today is Euplokamis in the order Cydippida. Their nerve cells arise from the same progenitor cells as the colloblasts.

The largest single sensory feature is the aboral organ (at the opposite end from the mouth). Its main component is a statocyst, a balance sensor consisting of a statolith, a tiny grain of calcium carbonate, supported on four bundles of cilia, called "balancers", that sense its orientation. The statocyst is protected by a transparent dome made of long, immobile cilia. A ctenophore does not automatically try to keep the statolith resting equally on all the balancers. Instead, its response is determined by the animal's "mood", in other words, the overall state of the nervous system. For example, if a ctenophore with trailing tentacles captures prey, it will often put some comb rows into reverse, spinning the mouth towards the prey.

Research supports the hypothesis that the ciliated larvae in cnidarians and bilaterians share an ancient and common origin. The larvae's apical organ is involved in the formation of the nervous system. The aboral organ of comb jellies is not homologous with the apical organ in other animals, and the formation of their nervous system has therefore a different embryonic origin.

Ctenophore nerve cells and nervous system have different biochemistry as compared to other animals. For instance, they lack the genes and enzymes required to manufacture neurotransmitters like serotonin, dopamine, nitric oxide, octopamine, noradrenaline, and others, otherwise seen in all other animals with a nervous system, with the genes coding for the receptors for each of these neurotransmitters missing. They have been found to use L-glutamate as a neurotransmitter, and have an unusually high variety of ionotropic glutamate receptors and genes for glutamate synthesis and transport compared to other metazoans. The genomic content of the nervous system genes is the smallest known of any animal, and could represent the minimum genetic requirements for a functional nervous system. Therefore, if ctenophores are the sister group to all other metazoans, nervous systems may have either been lost in sponges and placozoans, or arisen more than once among metazoans. Also monofunctional catalase (CAT), one of the three major families of antioxidant enzymes that target hydrogen peroxide (H2O2), an important signaling molecule for synaptic and neuronal activity, is absent, most likely due to gene loss.

Cydippids

Cydippid ctenophores have bodies that are more or less rounded, sometimes nearly spherical and other times more cylindrical or egg-shaped; the common coastal "sea gooseberry", Pleurobrachia, sometimes has an egg-shaped body with the mouth at the narrow end, although some individuals are more uniformly round. From opposite sides of the body extends a pair of long, slender tentacles, each housed in a sheath into which it can be withdrawn. Some species of cydippids have bodies that are flattened to various extents so that they are wider in the plane of the tentacles.

The tentacles of cydippid ctenophores are typically fringed with tentilla ("little tentacles"), although a few genera have simple tentacles without these sidebranches. The tentacles and tentilla are densely covered with microscopic colloblasts that capture prey by sticking to it. Colloblasts are specialized mushroom-shaped cells in the outer layer of the epidermis, and have three main components: a domed head with vesicles (chambers) that contain adhesive; a stalk that anchors the cell in the lower layer of the epidermis or in the mesoglea; and a spiral thread that coils round the stalk and is attached to the head and to the root of the stalk. The function of the spiral thread is uncertain, but it may absorb stress when prey tries to escape, and thus prevent the collobast from being torn apart.

In addition to colloblasts, members of the genus Haeckelia, which feed mainly on jellyfish, incorporate their victims' stinging nematocytes into their own tentacles – some cnidaria-eating nudibranchs similarly incorporate nematocytes into their bodies for defense. The tentilla of Euplokamis differ significantly from those of other cydippids: they contain striated muscle, a cell type otherwise unknown in the phylum Ctenophora; and they are coiled when relaxed, while the tentilla of all other known ctenophores elongate when relaxed. Euplokamis''' tentilla have three types of movement that are used in capturing prey: they may flick out very quickly (in 40 to 60 milliseconds); they can wriggle, which may lure prey by behaving like small planktonic worms; and they coil round prey. The unique flicking is an uncoiling movement powered by contraction of the striated muscle. The wriggling motion is produced by smooth muscles, but of a highly specialized type. Coiling around prey is accomplished largely by the return of the tentilla to their inactive state, but the coils may be tightened by smooth muscle.

There are eight rows of combs that run from near the mouth to the opposite end, and are spaced evenly round the body. The "combs" beat in a metachronal rhythm rather like that of a Mexican wave. From each balancer in the statocyst a ciliary groove runs out under the dome and then splits to connect with two adjacent comb rows, and in some species runs along the comb rows. This forms a mechanical system for transmitting the beat rhythm from the combs to the balancers, via water disturbances created by the cilia.

Lobates

The Lobata has a pair of lobes, which are muscular, cuplike extensions of the body that project beyond the mouth. Their inconspicuous tentacles originate from the corners of the mouth, running in convoluted grooves and spreading out over the inner surface of the lobes (rather than trailing far behind, as in the Cydippida). Between the lobes on either side of the mouth, many species of lobates have four auricles, gelatinous projections edged with cilia that produce water currents that help direct microscopic prey toward the mouth. This combination of structures enables lobates to feed continuously on suspended planktonic prey.

Lobates have eight comb-rows, originating at the aboral pole and usually not extending beyond the body to the lobes; in species with (four) auricles, the cilia edging the auricles are extensions of cilia in four of the comb rows. Most lobates are quite passive when moving through the water, using the cilia on their comb rows for propulsion, although Leucothea has long and active auricles whose movements also contribute to propulsion. Members of the lobate genera Bathocyroe and Ocyropsis can escape from danger by clapping their lobes, so that the jet of expelled water drives them back very quickly. Unlike cydippids, the movements of lobates' combs are coordinated by nerves rather than by water disturbances created by the cilia, yet combs on the same row beat in the same Mexican wave style as the mechanically coordinated comb rows of cydippids and beroids. This may have enabled lobates to grow larger than cydippids and to have less egg-like shapes.

An unusual species first described in 2000, Lobatolampea tetragona, has been classified as a lobate, although the lobes are "primitive" and the body is medusa-like when floating and disk-like when resting on the sea-bed.

Beroids

The Beroida, also known as Nuda, have no feeding appendages, but their large pharynx, just inside the large mouth and filling most of the saclike body, bears "macrocilia" at the oral end. These fused bundles of several thousand large cilia are able to "bite" off pieces of prey that are too large to swallow whole – almost always other ctenophores. In front of the field of macrocilia, on the mouth "lips" in some species of Beroe, is a pair of narrow strips of adhesive epithelial cells on the stomach wall that "zip" the mouth shut when the animal is not feeding, by forming intercellular connections with the opposite adhesive strip. This tight closure streamlines the front of the animal when it is pursuing prey.

Other body forms
The Ganeshida has a pair of small oral lobes and a pair of tentacles. The body is circular rather than oval in cross-section, and the pharynx extends over the inner surfaces of the lobes.

The Thalassocalycida, only discovered in 1978 and known from only one species, are medusa-like, with bodies that are shortened in the oral-aboral direction, and short comb-rows on the surface furthest from the mouth, originating from near the aboral pole. They capture prey by movements of the bell and possibly by using two short tentacles.

The Cestida ("belt animals") are ribbon-shaped planktonic animals, with the mouth and aboral organ aligned in the middle of opposite edges of the ribbon. There is a pair of comb-rows along each aboral edge, and tentilla emerging from a groove all along the oral edge, which stream back across most of the wing-like body surface. Cestids can swim by undulating their bodies as well as by the beating of their comb-rows.

Most Platyctenida have oval bodies that are flattened in the oral-aboral direction, with a pair of tentilla-bearing tentacles on the aboral surface. They cling to and creep on surfaces by everting the pharynx and using it as a muscular "foot". All but one of the known platyctenid species lack comb-rows. Platyctenids are usually cryptically colored, live on rocks, algae, or the body surfaces of other invertebrates, and are often revealed by their long tentacles with many side branches, seen streaming off the back of the ctenophore into the current.

Reproduction and development

Adults of most species can regenerate tissues that are damaged or removed, although only platyctenids reproduce by cloning, splitting off from the edges of their flat bodies fragments that develop into new individuals.

The last common ancestor (LCA) of the ctenophores was hermaphroditic. Some are simultaneous hermaphrodites, which can produce both eggs and sperm at the same time, while others are sequential hermaphrodites, in which the eggs and sperm mature at different times. There is no metamorphosis. At least three species are known to have evolved separate sexes (dioecy); Ocyropsis crystallina and Ocyropsis maculata in the genus Ocyropsis and Bathocyroe fosteri in the genus Bathocyroe. The gonads are located in the parts of the internal canal network under the comb rows, and eggs and sperm are released via pores in the epidermis. Fertilization is generally external, but platyctenids use internal fertilization and keep the eggs in brood chambers until they hatch. Self-fertilization has occasionally been seen in species of the genus Mnemiopsis, and it is thought that most of the hermaphroditic species are self-fertile.

Development of the fertilized eggs is direct; there is no distinctive larval form. Juveniles of all groups are generally planktonic, and most species resemble miniature adult cydippids, gradually developing their adult body forms as they grow. In the genus Beroe, however, the juveniles have large mouths and, like the adults, lack both tentacles and tentacle sheaths. In some groups, such as the flat, bottom-dwelling platyctenids, the juveniles behave more like true larvae. They live among the plankton and thus occupy a different ecological niche from their parents, only attaining the adult form by a more radical ontogeny. after dropping to the sea-floor.

At least in some species, juvenile ctenophores appear capable of producing small quantities of eggs and sperm while they are well below adult size, and adults produce eggs and sperm for as long as they have sufficient food. If they run short of food, they first stop producing eggs and sperm, and then shrink in size. When the food supply improves, they grow back to normal size and then resume reproduction. These features make ctenophores capable of increasing their populations very quickly. Members of the Lobata and Cydippida also have a reproduction form called dissogeny; two sexually mature stages, first as larva and later as juveniles and adults. During their time as larva they are capable of releasing gametes periodically. After their first reproductive period is over they will not produce more gametes again until later. A population of Mertensia ovum in the central Baltic Sea have become paedogenetic, and consist solely of sexually mature larvae less than 1.6 mm.

Colors and bioluminescence

Most ctenophores that live near the surface are mostly colorless and almost transparent. However some deeper-living species are strongly pigmented, for example the species known as "Tortugas red" (see illustration here), which has not yet been formally described. Platyctenids generally live attached to other sea-bottom organisms, and often have similar colors to these host organisms. The gut of the deep-sea genus Bathocyroe is red, which hides the bioluminescence of copepods it has swallowed.

The comb rows of most planktonic ctenophores produce a rainbow effect, which is not caused by bioluminescence but by the scattering of light as the combs move. Most species are also bioluminescent, but the light is usually blue or green and can only be seen in darkness. However some significant groups, including all known platyctenids and the cydippid genus Pleurobrachia, are incapable of bioluminescence.

When some species, including Bathyctena chuni, Euplokamis stationis and Eurhamphaea vexilligera, are disturbed, they produce secretions (ink) that luminesce at much the same wavelengths as their bodies. Juveniles will luminesce more brightly in relation to their body size than adults, whose luminescence is diffused over their bodies. Detailed statistical investigation has not suggested the function of ctenophores' bioluminescence nor produced any correlation between its exact color and any aspect of the animals' environments, such as depth or whether they live in coastal or mid-ocean waters.

In ctenophores, bioluminescence is caused by the activation of calcium-activated proteins named photoproteins in cells called photocytes, which are often confined to the meridional canals that underlie the eight comb rows. In the genome of Mnemiopsis leidyi ten genes encode photoproteins. These genes are co-expressed with opsin genes in the developing photocytes of Mnemiopsis leidyi, raising the possibility that light production and light detection may be working together in these animals.

Ecology

Distribution
Ctenophores are found in most marine environments: from polar waters to the tropics; near coasts and in mid-ocean; from the surface waters to the ocean depths. The best-understood are the genera Pleurobrachia, Beroe and Mnemiopsis, as these planktonic coastal forms are among the most likely to be collected near shore. No ctenophores have been found in fresh water.

In 2013, the marine ctenophore Mnemiopsis leidyi was recorded in a lake in Egypt, accidentally introduced by the transport of fish (mullet) fry; this was the first record from a true lake, though other species are found in the brackish water of coastal lagoons and estuaries.

Ctenophores may be abundant during the summer months in some coastal locations, but in other places, they are uncommon and difficult to find.

In bays where they occur in very high numbers, predation by ctenophores may control the populations of small zooplanktonic organisms such as copepods, which might otherwise wipe out the phytoplankton (planktonic plants), which are a vital part of marine food chains.

Prey and predators
Almost all ctenophores are predators – there are no vegetarians and only one genus that is partly parasitic. If food is plentiful, they can eat 10 times their own weight per day. While Beroe preys mainly on other ctenophores, other surface-water species prey on zooplankton (planktonic animals) ranging in size from the microscopic, including mollusc and fish larvae, to small adult crustaceans such as copepods, amphipods, and even krill. Members of the genus Haeckelia prey on jellyfish and incorporate their prey's nematocysts (stinging cells) into their own tentacles instead of colloblasts. Ctenophores have been compared to spiders in their wide range of techniques for capturing prey – some hang motionless in the water using their tentacles as "webs", some are ambush predators like Salticid jumping spiders, and some dangle a sticky droplet at the end of a fine thread, as bolas spiders do. This variety explains the wide range of body forms in a phylum with rather few species. The two-tentacled "cydippid" Lampea feeds exclusively on salps, close relatives of sea-squirts that form large chain-like floating colonies, and juveniles of Lampea attach themselves like parasites to salps that are too large for them to swallow. Members of the cydippid genus Pleurobrachia and the lobate Bolinopsis often reach high population densities at the same place and time because they specialize in different types of prey: Pleurobrachia's long tentacles mainly capture relatively strong swimmers such as adult copepods, while Bolinopsis generally feeds on smaller, weaker swimmers such as rotifers and mollusc and crustacean larvae.

Ctenophores used to be regarded as "dead ends" in marine food chains because it was thought their low ratio of organic matter to salt and water made them a poor diet for other animals. It is also often difficult to identify the remains of ctenophores in the guts of possible predators, although the combs sometimes remain intact long enough to provide a clue. Detailed investigation of chum salmon, Oncorhynchus keta, showed that these fish digest ctenophores 20 times as fast as an equal weight of shrimps, and that ctenophores can provide a good diet if there are enough of them around. Beroids prey mainly on other ctenophores. Some jellyfish and turtles eat large quantities of ctenophores, and jellyfish may temporarily wipe out ctenophore populations. Since ctenophores and jellyfish often have large seasonal variations in population, most fish that prey on them are generalists and may have a greater effect on populations than the specialist jelly-eaters. This is underlined by an observation of herbivorous fishes deliberately feeding on gelatinous zooplankton during blooms in the Red Sea. The larvae of some sea anemones are parasites on ctenophores, as are the larvae of some flatworms that parasitize fish when they reach adulthood.

Ecological impacts
Most species are hermaphrodites, and juveniles of at least some species are capable of reproduction before reaching the adult size and shape. This combination of hermaphroditism and early reproduction enables small populations to grow at an explosive rate.

Ctenophores may balance marine ecosystems by preventing an over-abundance of copepods from eating all the phytoplankton (planktonic plants), which are the dominant marine producers of organic matter from non-organic ingredients.

On the other hand, in the late 1980s the Western Atlantic ctenophore Mnemiopsis leidyi was accidentally introduced into the Black Sea and Sea of Azov via the ballast tanks of ships, and has been blamed for causing sharp drops in fish catches by eating both fish larvae and small crustaceans that would otherwise feed the adult fish. Mnemiopsis is well equipped to invade new territories (although this was not predicted until after it so successfully colonized the Black Sea), as it can breed very rapidly and tolerate a wide range of water temperatures and salinities. The impact was increased by chronic overfishing, and by eutrophication that gave the entire ecosystem a short-term boost, causing the Mnemiopsis population to increase even faster than normal – and above all by the absence of efficient predators on these introduced ctenophores. Mnemiopsis populations in those areas were eventually brought under control by the accidental introduction of the Mnemiopsis-eating North American ctenophore Beroe ovata, and by a cooling of the local climate from 1991 to 1993, which significantly slowed the animal's metabolism. However the abundance of plankton in the area seems unlikely to be restored to pre-Mnemiopsis levels.

In the late 1990s Mnemiopsis appeared in the Caspian Sea. Beroe ovata arrived shortly after, and is expected to reduce but not eliminate the impact of Mnemiopsis there. Mnemiopsis also reached the eastern Mediterranean in the late 1990s and now appears to be thriving in the North Sea and Baltic Sea.

 Taxonomy 
The number of known living ctenophore species is uncertain since many of those named and formally described have turned out to be identical to species known under other scientific names. Claudia Mills estimates that there about 100 to 150 valid species that are not duplicates, and that at least another 25, mostly deep-sea forms, have been recognized as distinct but not yet analyzed in enough detail to support a formal description and naming.

Early classification
Early writers combined ctenophores with cnidarians into a single phylum called Coelenterata on account of morphological similarities between the two groups. Like cnidarians, the bodies of ctenophores consist of a mass of jelly, with one layer of cells on the outside and another lining the internal cavity. In ctenophores, however, these layers are two cells deep, while those in cnidarians are only a single cell deep. Ctenophores also resemble cnidarians in relying on water flow through the body cavity for both digestion and respiration, as well as in having a decentralized nerve net rather than a brain.
Genomic studies have suggested that the neurons of Ctenophora, which differ in many ways from other animal neurons, evolved independently from those of the other animals, and increasing awareness of the differences between the comb jellies and the other coelentarata has persuaded more recent authors to classify the two as separate phyla. The position of the ctenophores in the evolutionary family tree of animals has long been debated, and the majority view at present, based on molecular phylogenetics, is that cnidarians and bilaterians are more closely related to each other than either is to ctenophores.

Modern taxonomy

The traditional classification divides ctenophores into two classes, those with tentacles (Tentaculata) and those without (Nuda). The Nuda contains only one order (Beroida) and family (Beroidae), and two genera, Beroe (several species) and Neis (one species).

The Tentaculata are divided into the following eight orders:

 Cydippida, egg-shaped animals with long tentacles
 Lobata, with paired thick lobes
 Platyctenida, flattened animals that live on or near the sea-bed; most lack combs as adults, and use their pharynges as suckers to attach themselves to surfaces
 Ganeshida, with a pair of small lobes round the mouth, but an extended pharynx like that of platyctenids
 Cambojiida
 Cryptolobiferida
 Thalassocalycida, with short tentacles and a jellyfish-like "umbrella"
 Cestida, ribbon-shaped and the largest ctenophores

Evolutionary history
Nevertheless, a recent molecular phylogenetics analysis concludes that the common ancestor originated approximately 350 million years ago ± 88 million years ago, conflicting with previous estimates which suggests it occurred  after the Cretaceous–Paleogene extinction event.

Fossil record

Because of their soft, gelatinous bodies, ctenophores are extremely rare as fossils, and fossils that have been interpreted as ctenophores have been found only in lagerstätten, places where the environment was exceptionally suited to the preservation of soft tissue. Until the mid-1990s only two specimens good enough for analysis were known, both members of the crown group, from the early Devonian (Emsian) period. All three lacked tentacles but had between 24 and 80  comb rows, far more than the 8  typical of living species. They also appear to have had internal organ-like structures unlike anything found in living ctenophores. One of the fossil species first reported in 1996 had a large mouth, apparently surrounded by a folded edge that may have been muscular. Evidence from China a year later suggests that such ctenophores were widespread in the Cambrian, but perhaps very different from modern species – for example one fossil's comb-rows were mounted on prominent vanes. The youngest fossil of a species outside the crown group is the species Daihuoides from late Devonian, and belongs to a basal group that was assumed to have gone extinct more than 140 million years earlier.

The Ediacaran Eoandromeda could putatively represent a comb jelly. It has eightfold symmetry, with eight spiral arms resembling the comblike rows of a Ctenophore. If it is indeed a Ctenophore, it places the group close to the origin of the Bilateria.
De-Gan Shu, Simon Conway Morris et al. found on its branches what they considered rows of cilia, used for filter feeding. They suggested that Stromatoveris was an evolutionary "aunt" of ctenophores, and that ctenophores originated from sessile animals whose descendants became swimmers and changed the cilia from a feeding mechanism to a propulsion system. Other fossils that could support the idea of ctenophores having evolved from sessile forms are Dinomischus and Daihua sanqiong, which also lived on the seafloor, had organic skeletons and cilia-covered tentacles surrounding their mouth, although not all yet agree that these were actually comb jellies.

520 million years old Cambrian fossils also from Chengjiang in China show a now wholly extinct class of ctenophore, named "Scleroctenophora", that had a complex internal skeleton with long spines. The skeleton also supported eight soft-bodied flaps, which could have been used for swimming and possibly feeding. One form, Thaumactena, had a streamlined body resembling that of arrow worms and could have been an agile swimmer.

Relationship to other animal groups
The phylogenetic relationship of ctenophores to the rest of Metazoa is very important to our understanding of the early evolution of animals and the origin of multicellularity. It has been the focus of debate for many years. Ctenophores have been purported to be the sister lineage to the Bilateria, sister to the Cnidaria, sister to Cnidaria, Placozoa, and Bilateria, and sister to all other animals.

Walter Garstang in his book Larval Forms and Other Zoological Verses (Mülleria and the Ctenophore) even expressed a theory that ctenophores were descended from a neotenic Mülleria larva of a polyclad.

A series of studies that looked at the presence and absence of members of gene families and signalling pathways (e.g., homeoboxes, nuclear receptors, the Wnt signaling pathway, and sodium channels) showed evidence congruent with the latter two scenarios, that ctenophores are either sister to Cnidaria, Placozoa, and Bilateria or sister to all other animal phyla.

Several more recent studies comparing complete sequenced genomes of ctenophores with other sequenced animal genomes have also supported ctenophores as the sister lineage to all other animals. This position would suggest that neural and muscle cell types either were lost in major animal lineages (e.g., Porifera and Placozoa) or evolved independently in the ctenophore lineage.

Other researchers have argued that the placement of Ctenophora as sister to all other animals is a statistical anomaly caused by the high rate of evolution in ctenophore genomes, and that Porifera (sponges) is the earliest-diverging animal taxon instead. As such, the Ctenophora appear to be a basal diploblast clade. In agreement with the latter point, the analysis of a very large sequence alignment at the metazoan taxonomic scale (1,719 proteins totalizing ca. 400,000 amino acid positions) showed that ctenophores emerge as the second-earliest branching animal lineage, and sponges are sister-group to all other multicellular animals. Also, research on mucin genes, which allow an animal to produce mucus, shows that sponges have never had them while all other animals, including comb jellies, appear to share genes with a common origin. And it has been revealed that despite all their differences, ctenophoran neurons share the same foundation as cnidarian neurons after findings shows that peptide-expressing neurons are probably ancestral to chemical neurotransmitters.

Yet another study strongly rejects the hypothesis that sponges are the sister group to all other extant animals and establishes the placement of Ctenophora as the sister group to all other animals, and disagreement with the last-mentioned paper is explained by methodological problems in analyses in that work.
Neither ctenophores or sponges possess HIF pathways, and are the only known animal phyla that lack any true hox genes. A few species from other phyla; the nemertean pilidium larva, the larva of the Phoronid species Phoronopsis harmeri and the acorn worm larva Schizocardium californicum, don't depend on hox genes in their larval development either, but need them during metamorphosis to reach their adult form.Hox genes pattern the anterior-posterior axis of the juvenile but not the larva in a maximally indirect developing invertebrate, Micrura alaskensis (Nemertea)

Relationships within Ctenophora

Relationships within the Ctenophora.
Since all modern ctenophores except the beroids have cydippid-like larvae, it has widely been assumed that their last common ancestor also resembled cydippids, having an egg-shaped body and a pair of retractable tentacles. Richard Harbison's purely morphological analysis in 1985 concluded that the cydippids are not monophyletic, in other words do not contain all and only the descendants of a single common ancestor that was itself a cydippid. Instead he found that various cydippid families were more similar to members of other ctenophore orders than to other cydippids. He also suggested that the last common ancestor of modern ctenophores was either cydippid-like or beroid-like. A molecular phylogeny analysis in 2001, using 26 species, including 4 recently discovered ones, confirmed that the cydippids are not monophyletic and concluded that the last common ancestor of modern ctenophores was cydippid-like. It also found that the genetic differences between these species were very small – so small that the relationships between the Lobata, Cestida and Thalassocalycida remained uncertain. This suggests that the last common ancestor of modern ctenophores was relatively recent, and perhaps survived the Cretaceous–Paleogene extinction event  while other lineages perished. When the analysis was broadened to include representatives of other phyla, it concluded that cnidarians are probably more closely related to bilaterians than either group is to ctenophores but that this diagnosis is uncertain. A clade including Mertensia, Charistephane and Euplokamis may be the sister lineage to all other ctenophores.

Divergence times estimated from molecular data indicated approximately how many million years ago (Mya) the major clades diversified: 350 Mya for Cydippida relative to other Ctenophora, and 260 Mya for Platyctenida relative to Beroida and Lobata.

See also
 Gelatinous zooplankton

References

 Further reading 
 R. S. K. Barnes, P. Calow, P. J. W. Olive, D. W. Golding, J. I. Spicer, The invertebrates – a synthesis, 3rd ed, Blackwell, 2001, ch. 3.4.3, p. 63, 
 R. C. Brusca, G. J. Brusca, Invertebrates, 2nd Ed, Sinauer Associates, 2003, ch. 9, p. 269, 
 J. Moore, An Introduction to the Invertebrates, Cambridge Univ. Press, 2001, ch. 5.4, p. 65, 
 W. Schäfer, Ctenophora, Rippenquallen, in W. Westheide and R. Rieger: Spezielle Zoologie Band 1, Gustav Fischer Verlag, Stuttgart 1996
 Bruno Wenzel, Glastiere des Meeres. Rippenquallen (Acnidaria), 1958, 
 Mark Shasha, Night of the Moonjellies, 1992, Simon & Schuster, 
 Douglas Fox, "Aliens in our midst: What the ctenophore says about the evolution of intelligence", 2017, Aeon.co.

 External links 

 Plankton Chronicles Short documentary films & photos
 Jellyfish and Comb Jellies overview at the Smithsonian Ocean Portal
Ctenophores from the São Sebastião Channel, Brazil
Video of ctenophores at the National Zoo in Washington DC
Tree Of Animal Life Has Branches Rearranged, By Evolutionary Biologists
Australian Ctenophora Fact Sheet
The Jelly Connection – striking images, including a Beroe'' specimen attacking another ctenophore
In Search of the First Animals

 
Bioluminescent ctenophores
Articles containing video clips
Animal phyla
Cambrian Series 2 first appearances
Extant Cambrian first appearances